Harris Horatius (born October 11, 1995) is a wushu taolu athlete from Indonesia. He made his international debut at the 2019 World Wushu Championships where he won a gold medal in duilian and a bronze medal in nangun. A few months later, he competed in the 2019 Southeast Asian Games where he won another gold medal in duilian and silver medals in nanquan and nandao/nangun combined. After the COVID-19 pandemic, he competed in the 2021 Southeast Asian Games held in May 2022 where he won a silver medal in nanquan and a bronze medal in nangun. Shortly after, he won the silver medal in nanquan/nangun combined at the 2022 World Games.

References

1995 births
Living people
Indonesian wushu practitioners
Sportspeople from Medan
Competitors at the 2022 World Games
World Games silver medalists
World Games medalists in wushu
Wushu practitioners at the 2018 Asian Games
Competitors at the 2019 Southeast Asian Games
Competitors at the 2021 Southeast Asian Games
Southeast Asian Games gold medalists for Indonesia
Southeast Asian Games silver medalists for Indonesia
Southeast Asian Games bronze medalists for Indonesia
21st-century Indonesian people